Coleophora symmicta is a moth of the family Coleophoridae. It is found in China.

References

symmicta
Moths of Asia
Moths described in 1982